In economics, the lump of labour fallacy is the misconception that there is a fixed amount of work—a lump of labour—to be done within an economy which can be distributed to create more or fewer jobs. It was considered a fallacy in 1891 by economist David Frederick Schloss, who held that the amount of work is not fixed.

The term originated to rebut the idea that reducing the number of hours employees are allowed to labour during the working day would lead to a reduction in unemployment. The term is also commonly used to describe the belief that increasing labour productivity, immigration, or automation causes an increase in unemployment. Whereas opponents of immigration argue that immigrants displace a country's workers, this is a fallacy, as the number of jobs in the economy is not fixed and immigration increases the size of the economy and may increase productivity, innovation, and overall economic activity, as well as reduce incentives for off-shoring and business closures, thus creating more jobs.

The lump of labor fallacy is also known as the lump of jobs fallacy, fallacy of labour scarcity, fixed pie fallacy, and the zero-sum fallacy—due to its ties to zero-sum games. The term "fixed pie fallacy" is also used more generally to refer to the idea that there is a fixed amount of wealth in the world. This and other zero-sum fallacies can be caused by zero-sum bias.

Immigration 
The lump of labour fallacy has been applied to concerns around immigration and labour. Given a fixed availability of employment, the lump of labour position argues that allowing immigration of working-age people reduces the availability of work for native-born workers ("they are taking our jobs").

However, skilled immigrating workers can bring capabilities that are not available in the native workforce, for example in academic research or information technology. Additionally, immigrating workforces also create new jobs by expanding demand, thus creating more jobs, either directly by setting up businesses (therefore requiring local services or workers), or indirectly by raising consumption. As an example, a greater population that eats more groceries will increase demand from shops, which will therefore require additional shop staff.

Employment regulations 
Advocates of restricting working hours regulation may assume that there is a fixed amount of work to be done within the economy. By reducing the amount that those who are already employed are allowed to work, the remaining amount will then accrue to the unemployed. This policy was adopted by the governments of Herbert Hoover in the United States and Lionel Jospin in France, in the 35-hour working week (though in France various exemptions to the law were granted by later centre-right governments).

Many economists agree that such proposals are likely to be ineffective, because there are usually substantial administrative costs associated with employing more workers. These can include additional costs in recruitment, training, and management that would increase average cost per unit of output. This overall would lead to a reduced production per worker, and may even result in higher unemployment.

Early retirement 
Early retirement has been used to induce workers to accept termination of employment before retirement age following the employer's diminished labour needs. Government support for the practice has come from the belief that this should lead to a reduction in unemployment. The unsustainability of this practice has now been recognised, and the trend in Europe is now towards postponement of the retirement age.

In an editorial in The Economist a thought experiment is proposed in which old people leave the workforce in favour of young people, on whom they become dependent for their living through state benefits. It is then argued that since growth depends on having either more workers or greater productivity, the society cannot really become more prosperous by paying an increasing number of its citizens unproductively. The article also points out that even early retirees with private pension funds become a burden on society as they also depend on equity and bond income generated by workers.

See also 
 Indivisibility of labour
 Labour (economics)
 Luddite fallacy
 Parable of the broken window
 Working time
 Zero-sum bias

References

External links 
 Paul Krugman essay on the Lump of Labour Fallacy
 The Economist Glossary: Lump of Labour fallacy
 Zero sum fallacy in stock trading
 Examining the “Lump of Labor” Fallacy Using a Simple Economic Model

Non-cooperative games
Labour economics
Thought experiments